Issoria mackinnonii is a small brown-chequered-with-black (fritillary) butterfly found in the Palearctic region that belongs to the family Nymphalidae. It was first described by Lionel de Nicéville in 1891. It is found in the Nila and Baspa river valleys, the northwest Himalayas and central Nepal.

References

Issoria
Butterflies of Asia
Butterflies described in 1891